The Mill Cove Historic District is a  historic district in Westport, Connecticut, United States.  The district was listed on the National Register of Historic Places in 1991.  It consists of a small group of cottages, 15 of which are contributing buildings, and other cottages and outbuildings.  These well-preserved collection of Colonial Revival and Bungalow-style cottages were built between 1908 and 1940 on a barrier beach facing Long Island Sound, and are only accessible on foot.  They are generally small in size and set on open lots, although some, like the house at 54 Compo Mill Cove, have a high hedge for privacy.

See also

Compo–Owenoke Historic District
National Register of Historic Places listings in Fairfield County, Connecticut

References

Houses on the National Register of Historic Places in Connecticut
Colonial Revival architecture in Connecticut
Historic districts in Fairfield County, Connecticut
National Register of Historic Places in Fairfield County, Connecticut
Houses in Fairfield County, Connecticut
Historic districts on the National Register of Historic Places in Connecticut